Jonathan Pie is a fictional character created and portrayed by English actor and comedian Tom Walker. A political correspondent, Pie appears in a series of comedic online videos in which he rants angrily about British, American, and Australian politics, with the videos being presented as though he were a real reporter giving his personal opinions before or after filming a regular news segment.

History
The first spoof news report featuring Pie, released just after the election of Jeremy Corbyn as leader of the Labour Party in September 2015, was responding to mainstream media reports that gave particular weight to Corbyn's past relationship with Diane Abbott. Walker was soon approached by several media companies, including RT UK. He worked with RT for several months before leaving in July 2016, just before his appearance at the Edinburgh Festival Fringe in August.

The character received international coverage after the 2016 American presidential election, when his comments on Donald Trump's victory went viral and became a YouTube trending video.  As of 2022 the video had more than 4.5 million views, double that of the second-most popular.

Pie has occasionally appeared as the London correspondent for the Australian satirical news and current events programme The Weekly with Charlie Pickering.

Pie went on his second tour in 2018 with Back to the Studio. He performed 45 dates in the UK, five dates in Australia, and six dates in the US. In January 2020, a collaboration with environmental filmmaker Franny Armstrong led to a 13-minute mockumentary called Pie Net Zero. Some episodes, including the post-US election episode, were co-written with Andrew Doyle. Doyle's contribution began when the live show started.

In February 2022, Pie made his first of several appearances on The New York Times website and YouTube channel as part of their "opinion" section. These videos comment on UK politics for an American audience. Topics have included Boris Johnson, the Russian invasion of Ukraine and the influence of Russian oligarchs' investments and political donations, as well as the UK energy crisis, rising inflation, and labour strikes during the Conservative Party leadership election of Prime Minister Liz Truss.

Live tours

Filmography

See also
 Jonathan Cake, English actor of similar name and appearance.

References

External links
 
 Official website

English YouTubers
Fictional characters introduced in 2015
Fictional English people
Fictional reporters
2015 establishments in England